Bernadette Herrera-Dy (born 1975 or 1976) is a Filipina politician, a Member of the Philippine House of Representatives under the Bagong Henerasyon party-list.

Education
Herrera attended the University of the Philippines, where she obtained a bachelor's degree in business economics and a master's degree in finance.

Career

Quezon City councilor
Herrera was first elected as councilor for the 1st district of Quezon City in 2001, when she was 26. She ran under the ticket of mayoral candidate Feliciano Belmonte Jr. She was re-elected twice, serving until 2010.

Bagong Henerasyon
Herrera is the founder of Bagong Henerasyon Foundation Inc. in 2001, which was accredited and authorized by the Commission on Elections to vow for party-list representation in the House of Representatives in 2009.

Bagong Henerasyon fielded Herrera as its first nominee in the 2010 elections, in which they secured a single seat for the 15th Congress. The party lost their seat in the 2013 elections (16th Congress).

The partylist would regain its seat in the 2016 elections, which was filled by Herrera In the 17th Congress, Herrara co-authored with Tom Villarin of Akbayan House Bill No. 4113, which eventually signed into law as Republic Act No. 11210 or the Expanded Maternity Leave Law in 2019.

During the 18th Congress, Herrera was named Deputy Speaker. She co-authored a bill banning child marriage in the Philippines which lapsed into law as Republic Act No. 11596.

In the 19th Congress, Herrera questioned the bidding process for the Department of Education procurement of laptops through the Department of Budget and Management's Procurement Service (PS-DBM)

Herrera has also advocated the legal recognition of same-sex union in the Philippines; she filed bills seeking the legalization of civil unions for same sex partners in the 18th and 19th Congress.

Personal life
Herrera is married to businessman Edgar Allan Dy, and has two children.

References

Party-list members of the House of Representatives of the Philippines
Living people
Women members of the House of Representatives of the Philippines
21st-century Filipino women politicians
University of the Philippines alumni
1970s births